Nuclear Medicine and Biology is a peer-reviewed medical journal published by Elsevier that covers research on all aspects of nuclear medicine, including radiopharmacology, radiopharmacy and clinical studies of targeted radiotracers. It is the official journal of the Society of Radiopharmaceutical Sciences. According to the Journal Citation Reports, the journal has a 2011 impact factor of 3.023.

Abstracting and indexing
The journal is abstracted and indexed in:
 BIOSIS
 Elsevier BIOBASE
 Cambridge Scientific Abstracts
 Chemical Abstracts Service
 Current Contents/Life Sciences
 MEDLINE/PubMed
 EMBASE

References

External links 
 

Radiology and medical imaging journals
Nuclear medicine
Nuclear magnetic resonance
Radiopharmaceuticals
Elsevier academic journals
English-language journals
Publications established in 1978